Iran elects on national level a head of state and the head of government (the president), a legislature (the Majlis), and an "Assembly of Experts" (which elects the Supreme Leader). City and Village Council elections are also held every four years throughout the entire country. The president is elected for a four-year term by the citizens. The Parliament or Islamic Consultative Assembly (Majlis-e Shura-ye Eslami) currently has 290 members, also elected for a four-year term in multi- and single-seat  constituencies. Elections for the Assembly of Experts are held every eight years. All candidates have to be approved by the Guardian Council. See Politics of Iran for more details.

Until January 2007, when it was raised to 18, the voting age was 15 years, the lowest globally at the time.

The most recent Iranian presidential election was held on 18 June 2021 and the most recent legislative election on 21 February 2020.  Presidential and local elections were held on 19 May 2017 simultaneously. Previous parliamentary elections and Assembly of Experts elections were held on 26 February 2016. 

The nature of the elections in Iran has been a contentious issue. Since the inception of the Islamic Republic in 1979, many Western governments, human rights groups, independent observers and dissident organizations have described the post-Imperial elections as sham elections since its political system is  considered regularly labelled as anti-Western, undemocratic, authoritarian and totalitarian governed by the Supreme Leader.

Elections since 1979

Presidential elections

Majlis elections

Latest elections

2021 Presidential election

2021 Local election

2016 Assembly of Experts election

2020 Parliamentary election

See also
Iran Electoral Archive

References

External links
Election Data Archives
The Outcome of Iran’s Parliamentary Elections
Iran Data Portal, Princeton University
Iran Electoral Archive, Sant'Anna School of Advanced Studies
Results of parliamentary elections, Inter-Parliamentary Union
Psephos, Adam Carr's Election Archive
other
2009 Iranian elections page on BBC Persian
BBC Persian on Iran presidential elections
Video Archive of Iranian Elections